The Flying Fox in the Snowy Mountains is a two-part 1964 Hong Kong film based on Louis Cha's novel Fox Volant of the Snowy Mountain. The film was produced by Emei Film Company and directed by Lee Fa.

Cast
 Chiang Han as Wu Fei / Wu Yat-dou
 Pearl Au as Yuen Tze-yi
 Sheung-kwun Yuk as Ching Ling-so
 Chan Wai-yu as Mrs Wu
 Ng Yam-chi as Miu Yan-fung
 Shih Kien as Yim Kei
 Yuen Siu-tien as Lau Hok-jan

External links
 
 

1964 films
Films based on works by Jin Yong
Hong Kong martial arts films
Wuxia films
Works based on Flying Fox of Snowy Mountain
1960s Cantonese-language films